Olinde is both a given name and a surname. Notable people with the name include:

Olinde Rodrigues (1795–1851), French banker and social reformer
Louis Olinde (born 1998), German basketball player
Wilbert Olinde (born 1955), American-German basketball player

Other use
Olinde was a cover name used during the deployment of the ironclad .

See also
Olinda (disambiguation)